Hajredin Kuçi (born 2 January 1971 in Peć, Yugoslavia) is a Kosovar Albanian politician, who served as Deputy Prime Minister of Kosovo from 2008 to 2017 and as Minister of Justice from 2011 to 2016.

Other works
He is the author of Kosova's Independence: Stabilising or Destabilising Factor published at Houston, Texas in 2005 by Ramiz Tafilaj's Jalifat Publishing.

References

1971 births
Living people
Kosovan Muslims
Kosovo Albanians
Democratic Party of Kosovo politicians
Justice ministers of Kosovo
Deputy Prime Ministers of Kosovo